The Brasso Clay is a geologic formation in Trinidad and Tobago. It preserves fossils dating back to the Neogene period.

See also

 List of fossiliferous stratigraphic units in Trinidad and Tobago

References
 

Neogene Trinidad and Tobago